One Perfect Day may refer to:

 One Perfect Day (2004 film), an Australian film
 One Perfect Day (2013 film), a South Korean film
 "One Perfect Day" (Little Heroes song), 1982
 "One Perfect Day" (Lydia Denker song), 2004

See also
Perfect Day (disambiguation)